Betty McNamara (born 1941) played netball for New Zealand in the 1963 World Netball Championships.

Netball career
Betty McNamara was born on 2 December 1941. She played netball with the Auckland team as a defender before being the 32nd woman selected to play for the Silver Ferns, the New Zealand national netball team, in the 1963 world championships, which were held in Eastbourne, England. The Silver Ferns finished runners up in the competition, having lost the decisive match to Australia by 37-36. In all, McNamara won ten caps.

References

1941 births
Living people
New Zealand international netball players
1963 World Netball Championships players